Upper Arlington High School is the sole high school in the Upper Arlington City School District in Upper Arlington, Ohio, a northwest suburb of Columbus, Ohio.  It receives students from Jones Middle School and Hastings Middle School. The current principal of the high school is Mr. Andrew Theado. The mascot is a golden bear.

History and former buildings
The first building to serve as Upper Arlington High School, now Jones Middle School, was built in 1924, becoming the first permanent school in Upper Arlington. It served as the high school until 1956, when its replacement opened on Ridgeview Road. The new building, still the district's sole high school, was significantly larger to accommodate the growing school district.

In 2015, amidst safety concerns with the school, plans were announced to construct a new, larger high school adjacent to the former. It was completed in the summer of 2021, while the old Ridgeview building was demolished to make room for parking and sports facilities.

Academics
Upper Arlington High School offers Honors and Advanced Placement courses two to three years ahead of requirements and joined the International Baccalaureate program in 2005.

Upper Arlington High School also offers music programs, including band, orchestra, and vocal music performance classes, music theory, guitar, and IB music.

Athletics
The high school sports teams are named the Golden Bears.  Golf pro and UAHS alumnus Jack Nicklaus received his Golden Bear nickname from his alma mater.  Golden Bear sports teams consistently rank among the top Division I schools in Ohio, particularly in the sports of football, golf, tennis, basketball, water polo, cross country, lacrosse, and swimming.  The Upper Arlington football team captured the Division One state title in football in 2000, and were led by Jeff Backes, who earned the Mr. Football Award for Ohio, and Simon Fraser, who went on to play for the Ohio State Buckeyes and Cleveland Browns.

The school also has a rowing team that competes throughout the school year, rowing during Fall and Spring seasons. The Upper Arlington Crew team is the only scholastic rowing program in central Ohio, and it consistently races to top finishes at prestigious events such as the Midwest Scholastic, Midwest Junior, Scholastic Nationals and US Rowing Youth National Championship Regattas. The team also frequently sends boats to the Head of the Charles Regatta, a selective rowing event that attracts the best rowers from all over the world.

Upper Arlington is 3rd all-time in Ohio with 49 Ohio High School Athletic Association team state championships. Upper Arlington has won 116 state titles overall, including sports not sponsored by the OHSAA. Upper Arlington holds the record for most OHSAA state championships in one year (Boys' Golf, Girls' Cross Country, Boys' Swimming & Diving, Boys' Baseball) set in 1986–1987.

Ohio High School Athletic Association State Championships

 Boys' Baseball — 1987, 1990
 Boys' Basketball — 1937
 Boys' Football — 1967,1968,1969,2000
 Boys' Golf — 1941,1956,1960,1965,1968,1969,1972,1974,1977,1981,1982,1985,1986,1992,1993,1999,2006
 Boys' Lacrosse — 2022
 Boys' Swimming — 1985, 1986, 1987
 Boys' Track and Field — 1937, 1939
 Girls' Basketball — 1988 
 Girls' Cross Country — 1978, 1981, 1982, 1985, 1986, 1990
 Girls' Gymnastics — 1995
 Girls Lacrosse — 2017, 2018, 2019
 Girls' Swimming — 2003, 2005, 2006, 2007, 2008, 2009, 2010, 2011, 2012, 2015, 2016, 2017
 Girls' Track and Field — 1985

Other team state championships
 Boys' Water Polo** — 1992, 1993, 1994, 2000, 2004, 2009
 Girls' Water Polo** — 1994, 1995, 2000, 2001, 2002, 2003, 2004, 2005, 2006, 2008, 2010, 2012, 2014, 2015, 2016, 2019 
 Boys' Lacrosse*** — 1994, 1995, 1997, 1998, 2000, 2001, 2004, 2005, 2006

 ** Sponsored by Ohio High School Swim Coaches Association
 *** Sponsored by Ohio High School Lacrosse Association

Notable alumni 

 Jake Borelli — Actor, best known for his role as Dr. Levi Schmitt on Grey's Anatomy
 Lois McMaster Bujold — Hugo Award-winning novelist
 Beverly D'Angelo — Actress 
 Chris Frey Jr. — Former professional football player
Rose Goettemoeller — Assistant Secretary of State for Arms Control, Verification, and Compliance and the chief negotiator of the New START Treaty
 Blake Haxton — Paralympic rower and canoeist, silver medalist
 Abby Johnston — Olympic diver, silver medalist
Jack Nicklaus — Professional golfer 
Randy Skinner — Broadway Director and Choreographer
 George Smoot — Nobel Prize-winning astrophysicist
 Terry Waldo — Ragtime artist

Notes and references

External links
 Upper Arlington School District official website
 Upper Arlington High School website

High schools in Franklin County, Ohio
Upper Arlington, Ohio
Public high schools in Ohio
International Baccalaureate schools in Ohio